The Australian Indoor Tennis Championship, also known as the Australian Indoor Championship, the Australian Indoor Open and the Sydney Indoor for short, was a professional men's tennis tournament was played in Sydney, Australia. The tournament was an initiative from John Newcombe and was part of an expanding Asian-Australian fall Grand Prix circuit. The event was played under various names as part of the Grand Prix tennis circuit from 1973 through 1989 and as part of the ATP Tour from 1990 through 1994.  It was played on indoor hard courts at the Hordern Pavilion on the Sydney Showground through 1982 and at the Sydney Entertainment Centre beginning in 1983. The tournament was cancelled in June 1994 on financial grounds with tournament director and co-founder Graham Lovett citing insufficient television coverage and the difficulty of signing top players as the main reasons.

History

From 1975 to 1989 the event was sponsored by the Custom Credit and Swan Premium.

Records
Most singles titles: John McEnroe 4
Most consecutive singles titles: John McEnroe 4 (1980–1983)
Most singles finals: Ivan Lendl 5

Finals

Singles

Doubles

See also
 Sydney International

References

External links
 1973 ATP calendar

 
ATP Tour
Grand Prix tennis circuit
Hard court tennis tournaments
Indoor tennis tournaments
Defunct tennis tournaments in Australia